Jessica George (née Johnson) is an American farmer and politician who was appointed to the Oregon House of Representatives for the 25th district on December 10, 2021.

Career 
She is not seeking re-election in 2022.

Personal life 
She is the daughter of former state senator Rod Johnson. She lives in St. Paul, Oregon.

References 

Living people
Year of birth missing (living people)
Republican Party members of the Oregon House of Representatives
21st-century American women politicians
Women state legislators in Oregon
21st-century American politicians
People from Marion County, Oregon